Adrian Newman (born 21 December 1958) is a bishop of the Church of England; he was area Bishop of Stepney in the Diocese of London (2011–2018) and Dean of Rochester (2004–2011).

Early life and education
Newman was born on 21 December 1958 to John Henry Newman and Ruth Doreen Newman. He was educated at Rickmansworth School, a comprehensive school in Rickmansworth, Hertfordshire. He studied economics at the University of Bristol, graduating with a Bachelor of Science (BSc) degree in 1980. He then worked as an economist.

In 1982, Newman entered Trinity College, Bristol, an Evangelical Anglican theological college, to train for ordained ministry. Having studied theology during this time, he completed a Diploma of Higher Education (DipHE) in 1985. He left theological college in 1985 to be ordained in the Church of England, but continued his theological studies and completed a Master of Philosophy (MPhil) degree in 1989.

Ordained ministry
Newman was ordained in the Church of England as a deacon in 1985 and as a priest in 1986. From 1985 to 1989, he served his curacy at St Mark's Church, Forest Gate in the Diocese of Chelmsford. Then, from 1989 to 1996, he was Vicar of Christ Church, Wadsley Bridge and Hillsborough in the Diocese of Sheffield. He was also Area Dean of Hallam from 1994 to 1996. From 1996 to 2004, he was Rector of St Martin in the Bull Ring in the Diocese of Birmingham. In 2005, he was appointed the Dean of Rochester; this made him the head of the chapter of Rochester Cathedral.

Episcopal ministry
On 22 March 2011, it was announced that Newman would succeed Stephen Oliver as Bishop of Stepney, an area bishop of the Diocese of London. On 22 July 2011, he was consecrated as a bishop at St Paul's Cathedral by Rowan Williams, Archbishop of Canterbury.

In addition to his other pastoral duties, Newman made regular media appearances promoting ministry in the local community and was in attendance throughout London 2012.

Newman resigned his see effective 31 October 2018 on grounds of ill health.

Personal life
In 1981, Newman married Gillian Ann Hayes. Together they have three sons.

Honours
Newman was conferred with an honorary fellowship of Canterbury Christ Church University in 2009.

Styles
The Reverend Adrian Newman (1986–2004)
The Very Reverend Adrian Newman (2004–2011)
The Right Reverend Adrian Newman (2011–present)

References

External links
 Debrett's People of Today

1958 births
Living people
People from Hertfordshire
Alumni of the University of Bristol
Deans of Rochester
21st-century Church of England bishops
Bishops of Stepney
Fellows of Canterbury Christ Church University
Alumni of Trinity College, Bristol